Santo Zago (active 1550) was an Italian painter of the Renaissance period. He was born in Venice, was a follower of Titian. He painted Tobit and the Angel for the church of Santa Caterina.

References

16th-century Italian painters
Italian male painters
Painters from Venice
Renaissance painters
Year of death unknown
Year of birth unknown